Pringle is a Scottish surname.

Pringle may also refer to:

Places
In the United States
 Pringle, Georgia, an unincorporated community
 Pringle, Pennsylvania, borough
 Pringle, South Dakota, town

Elsewhere
 The Pringle, informal name for the London Velopark

Other
 Clan Pringle an Lowland Scottish clan from the Scottish Borders
 Pringles, potato-based snack
 Pringle manoeuvre, used in surgery
 USS Pringle (DD-477), US Navy destroyer sunk in World War II
 Pringles Park, baseball stadium in Jackson, Tennessee, named after the snack
 Pringle of Scotland, designer clothing brand based in Scotland

See also
 Pringle Bay, town in South Africa